2007 FAM League is the 56th edition season of current third-tier league competition in Malaysia.

The league winner for 2007 season was Proton F.C.

Teams

The following teams participated in the Malaysia FAM Cup 2007. In order by the number given by FAM:

  KOR RAMD
  DBKL S.C.
  FELDA United F.C.
  Malaysia U-16
  Kuala Lumpur Maju United FC 
  Perlis Bintong F.C.
  Tambun Tulang FC
  Waterfall Rangers
  Baverly KK 
  Proton FC 
  SUKSES FC
  Setia Putra FC
  T-Team

Team summaries

Stadia

League table

Pld = Matches played; W = Matches won; D = Matches drawn; L = Matches lost; F = Goals for; A = Goals against; GD = Goal difference; Pts = Points

References

3
2007